Donald Cannon may refer to:

 Donald Q. Cannon (born 1936), Mormon history professor at Brigham Young University
 D. James Cannon (1919–1998), member of the Utah House of Representatives
 Don Cannon (born 1979), American record producer and DJ.
 Don Cannon (news anchor) (born 1940), former television news anchor in Pittsburgh, Pennsylvania